The Reverend Alfred Itubwa Amram (21 December 1922 – 17 July 1989) was a Nauruan pastor and political figure.

Professional roles

Political role

He was a member of the first parliament of the Republic of Nauru. 
He was the Speaker of the Parliament of Nauru from 1968 to January 1971. 

Standing for Aiwo Constituency, Amram was elected to parliament in early 1968 just before the country's independence. Four years later he lost his seat to Kinza Clodumar.

Pastoral role

Amram was the first Nauruan-born ordained minister, with all preceding ministers coming from abroad. Amram was trained in Australia. Amram later served as head of the Nauruan Protestant Church.

Personal life
Amram was a member of the Iruwa tribe.

Death
Amram died on 17 July 1989, at age 66.

See also
 Politics of Nauru
 Elections in Nauru

References

Speakers of the Parliament of Nauru
Members of the Parliament of Nauru
1922 births
1989 deaths
People from Aiwo District
20th-century Nauruan politicians